Charles Frederick Dennée (1863 – April 29, 1946) was an American composer.  He wrote many pedagogical pieces for piano, and also composed a number of songs.

Biography
Charles Dennée was born in Oswego, New York in 1863. He was educated at the New England Conservatory of Music.

He became a successful concert pianist, giving over 1,000 performances in the 1880s and 1890s.

He died at his home in Brookline, Massachusetts on April 29, 1946.

Compositions
 Suite Moderne Op.8 (1885) 1.Prelude 2.Novelette 3.Danse Orientale 4.Romanza 5.Etude Caracteristique
 Danse Moderne Op.9 No.1
 3 Morceaux Op.10 (1885) 1.Serenade 2.Gavotte 3.Album Leaf
 Rondo Villageois Op.12 No.3
 Albumleaves Op.15 (1888)
 Suite de Ballet Op.23 (1894) 1.? 2.?  3.? 4.Tarantelle in A minor 5.Danse Humoristique
 5 Etudes Op.26 (1896) 1.Toccata 2.Le Papillon 3.Impromptu 4.Caprice 5.Tarantelle (Etude d'octaves)
 Mountain Scenes Op.30 (1902) 1.In the Canon 2.Arbutus 3.Sprites of the Glen 4.The Placid Lake 5.Forest Sounds 6.The Rainbow 7.A Burro Ride 8.Dance of the Gnomes 9.Around the Campfire
 3 Compositions Op.31 (1905) 1.Hide and Seek 2.Marche Mignonne 3.Elfin Revelry
 3 Morceaux Caracteristiques Op.32 (1905)
 L'Irresistible Op.33 (1908)
 Dearest (song) Op.38 No.1 (1911)
 Polonaise in A-flat major Op.39 No.2 (1913)
 2 Pianoforte Compositions Op.41 (1921) 1.? 2.The Whirling Doll - Impromptu

References

External links
 

1863 births
1946 deaths
American male composers
American composers
American music educators
New England Conservatory alumni
People from Oswego, New York